is a 13-episode Japanese original net animation in the motion comic style, directed by Akira Amemiya with Hiroyuki Imaishi serving as series production director and produced by Trigger and CoMix Wave. It was streamed via the Anime Bancho YouTube channel from December 24, 2012 to March 18, 2013. A second season has been announced. However this has been complicated by the passing of Inferno Cop's voice actor Junichi Goto in February 2020.

Synopsis
The series centers around the adventures of Inferno Cop, a police officer with a flaming head who seeks revenge after his family was murdered by Southern Cross, a shady, Illuminati-like organization that attempts to control the world with its various monsters and thugs. Inferno Cop dispenses ruthless justice on all lawbreakers he can find in Jack Knife Edge Town, generally by blowing them up, shooting them dead or both. Inferno Cop rapidly goes from one ridiculous incident to another, including fighting a newborn baby, travelling through time, fending off a zombie apocalypse, turning into a car for several episodes, and killing a mummy and becoming the new pharaoh after mishearing his sidekick's dying words. He ultimately tries to halt Southern Cross' attempts to bring about an end of the world with Inferno Cop as the key.

Recurring characters
Inferno Cop
A brash and violent former police officer turned vigilante. He drives a flaming cop car and his head is a flaming skull that wears sunglasses. He uses a revolver that blows up nearly anything it shoots. His family was murdered by Southern Cross, and it is implied that they killed him as well before the series. While most of the local police in Jack Knife Edge City excuse any crime so long as the perpetrators have "paid their taxes," Inferno Cop will tolerate no evil and destroy any lawbreaker on sight with little to no evidence. He is a middle school dropout and is severely weakened when underwater, though his skull/head stays on fire regardless.

Mr. Judge
A masked vigilante and purveyor of justice, both as a superhero and an actual judge.

Mecha Cop
A hulking robot armed with chain guns that are created by Southern Cross solely to kill Inferno Cop. When he proves incapable of doing so, they are forced to work together when they are both sent into the past, and eventually Hell itself. When Inferno Cop notices the exit to Hell, Mecha Cop chooses to stay in Hell and help others instead.

Auntie Grenda
Inferno Cop's aunt who lives in Hell. She is a kindly old lady despite her situation. Mecha Cop befriends her when he and Inferno Cop arrive in Hell, and she is later seen riding him into battle.

Claudia
A blonde woman saved by Inferno Cop, only to come back later, revealed to be a very powerful entity, with a passionate love for Inferno Cop. 

FBI
A trio of hitmen who work for the Southern Cross. One of them is short, one is tall, and one of them is fat. They attempt to kill Inferno Cop while he is in the hospital. The only thing they ever say is "FBI!".

Hellfire Boy
A young boy that Inferno Cop accidentally sets on fire after coming back from Hell. He becomes Inferno Cop's sidekick, and later sacrifices himself as fuel to help Inferno Cop win a race against Mr. Judge. He eventually returns as a malt loaf and is consumed by Inferno Cop twice (once in Egypt, and again before the final battle).

High Priest Altair, Deneb, and Vega
The masterminds of the Southern Cross. All three of them are cloaked in robes, and their faces look nearly inhumane.

Ariel Suzuki
A reporter who works for Channel 11. She does the weather and zombie reports, and also does a report when aliens invade and kidnap Inferno Cop. She is also the mother of Hellfire Boy.

Episode list

Special Episodes
There are three special episodes of Inferno Cop only shown at the 2015, 2016, and 2017 AnimeNEXT conventions. While the episodes have never been uploaded officially, one recording of the third episode is on Youtube. However, the recording only captures half of the episode. The episode starts at the end of Inferno Cop's cameo appearance in Space Patrol Luluco. Afterwards, Inferno Cop goes to America and loses a fight with Donald Trump. All three of the specials are notable for showcasing Studio Trigger's self-professed love for New Jersey, and for audience participation at the end of every short.

The 2015 special is the same short shown during a prior convention that year (Anime Expo). The 2016 special involves Inferno Cop and friends traveling to New Jersey to stop hardcore and casual anime fans from waging war against each other, which Inferno Cop remedies by killing both sides. Afterwards, he leads both his friends and the audience at the live panel in chanting "New Jersey Oi!" for 5 minutes straight. The 2017 special involves Inferno Cop criticizing Donald Trump while watching him on TV, only for the later to threaten to deport him through the television and the two engage in short-lived combat (in which Inferno Cop is cut in half and screams about how he is dying for an extended amount of time) Afterwards Inferno Cop leads both the cast and the Panel audience in singing "the American National Anthem" (A rendition of The Star Spangled Banner but with the lyrics replaced with "America daisuki, Hamburger daisuki" (I love America, I love Hamburger)) for at least 5 minutes.

China ban
On June 12, 2015, the Chinese Ministry of Culture listed Inferno Cop among 38 anime and manga titles banned in China.

Cameo
In episode 11 of Space Patrol Luluco, Inferno Cop makes a cameo appearance, where it is revealed that he worked for Space Patrol before becoming a vigilante.

References

External links

2012 anime ONAs
Studio Trigger
Fiction about skeletons
Censored television series
Works banned in China
Television censorship in China
Japanese animated web series
Zombie web series